Enolmis agenjoi is a moth of the family Scythrididae. It was described by Passerin d'Entrèves in 1988. It is found in Italy and France.

References

Scythrididae
Moths described in 1988